Wu Fuheng (1911–2001) was the president of Shandong University from December 1979 to June 1984.

1911 births
2001 deaths
Presidents of Shandong University
People from Luanzhou